39th meridian may refer to:

39th meridian east, a line of longitude east of the Greenwich Meridian
39th meridian west, a line of longitude west of the Greenwich Meridian